The Gardner–Webb Runnin' Bulldogs men's soccer program represents Gardner–Webb University in all NCAA Division I men's college soccer competitions. Founded in 1987, the Runnin' Bulldogs compete in the Big South Conference. The Runnin' Bulldogs are coached by Tony Setzer, who has coached the program since 1988. Gardner–Webb plays their home matches at Greene–Harbison Stadium, on the campus of Gardner–Webb University.

Seasons

NCAA Tournament history 
Army has appeared in one NCAA Tournaments. Their sole appearance came in 2006. Their combined NCAA record is 0–1–1.

References

External links 
 

 
1987 establishments in North Carolina
Association football clubs established in 1987